Kuznetsovsky is a rural locality (a khutor) in Verkhotorsky Selsoviet, Ishimbaysky District, Bashkortostan, Russia. The population was 98 as of 2010. There are 2 streets.

Geography 
Kuznetsovsky is located 36 km southeast of Ishimbay (the district's administrative centre) by road. Romadanovka is the nearest rural locality.

References 

Rural localities in Ishimbaysky District